The Devil is a surviving 1921 silent drama film directed by James Young and starring stage actor George Arliss in a film version of his 1908 Broadway success of Ferenc Molnár's play, The Devil (aka Az ordog) [1]. Long thought to be a lost film, a print was discovered in the 1990s and restored by the Library of Congress.

This was George Arliss' first film following a successful career on Broadway. Arliss' wife Florence Arliss co-starred with him in the film, and continued to do so until he died in 1946. Director Young was silent screen star Clara Kimball Young's ex-husband. Future Oscar-winner Fredric March had an uncredited bit part in the film.

Plot
The Devil, in the guise of a human named Dr. Muller (Arliss), meets a young couple (Marie and her fiance Georges) who remark upon looking at a Renaissance painting of a martyr that Evil could never triumph over Good. The Devil, taking this as a challenge, decides to bring about the couple's downfall. In the end, Marie resorts to the power of prayer and a shining crucifix appears that causes the Devil to disappear in a burst of flames.

Cast
George Arliss as Dr. Muller
Lucy Cotton as Marie Matin
Roland Bottomley as Georges Roben
Sylvia Breamer as Mimi
Florence Arliss as Marie's Aunt (credited as Mrs. George Arliss)
Edmund Lowe as Paul de Veaux
Fredric March as Bal Masque Participant (uncredited)

Preservation status
A copy of The Devil is preserved in the Library of Congress collection and the Archives Du Film Du CNC, Bois d'Arcy.

See also
The Devil (1918)

References

External links

1921 films
American silent feature films
American films based on plays
Pathé Exchange films
Associated Exhibitors films
Films directed by James Young
American black-and-white films
Films based on works by Ferenc Molnár
American remakes of foreign films
Remakes of Hungarian films
Silent American drama films
1921 drama films
1920s American films